Caught Up is the debut extended play by British singer-songwriter Sarah Close. It was released on 14 April 2017 by The Kodiak Club on streaming and digital download music services. It would peak at No. 13 on the UK iTunes Albums Chart.

Background
The EP's title, track listing, artwork and release date were officially revealed on 24 February 2017.

Singles
"Call Me Out" was released on 3 March 2017 as the first single from Caught Up. The song charted at number one on the UK Official Physical Singles Chart following the release of the EP.

Track listing

References

2017 EPs